We Don't Belong Here, previously entitled The Greens Are Gone, is an American drama film written and directed by Peer Pedersen. It stars Catherine Keener, Kaitlyn Dever, Riley Keough, Annie Starke, Cary Elwes, Maya Rudolph and Anton Yelchin in his final film role. The film was released on April 4, 2017, by Sony Pictures Entertainment.

Premise 
Nancy Green is the mother of a dysfunctional family. She is pushed to her limits, after her son, Maxwell, disappears.

Cast 
 Catherine Keener as Nancy Green, Madeline, Elisa, Lily and Maxwell’s mother
 Kaitlyn Dever as Lily Green, Nancy’s youngest daughter
 Anton Yelchin as Maxwell Green, Nancy’s son
 Riley Keough as Elisa Green, Nancy’s daughter
 Annie Starke as Madeline Green, Nancy’s oldest daughter
 Molly Shannon as Deborah
 Justin Chatwin as Tomas
 Austin Abrams as Davey
 Debra Mooney as Grandmother
 Maya Rudolph as Joanne
 Cary Elwes as Frank Harper
 Michelle Hurd as Tania
 Sarah Ramos as Jill
 Mark Famiglietti as Man at Track

Production 
On May 14, 2014, it was announced that Catherine Keener, Kiernan Shipka, Anton Yelchin, Riley Keough, Annie Starke, Cary Elwes and Lois Smith had joined the cast of the film, then titled The Greens Are Gone. Keener would play the mother of a dysfunctional family who is pushed to her limits after the disappearance of her son, played by Yelchin. Shipka would play her bipolar teenage daughter, while Keough and Starke would play the troubled grown daughters.  Starke, Glenn Close's real-life daughter, made her acting debut in the film. Peer Pedersen would make his directorial debut on the film based on his own script, produced by Annelise Dekker, Adam Gibbs, Michael Kristoff and Roger Joseph Pugliese. On June 5, 2014, Kaitlyn Dever joined the film, replacing Shipka, to play the bipolar daughter. Later, on June 12, 2014, Elwes’s casting was confirmed by Deadline; he would play Frank, a local in the town. On June 13, 2014, Maya Rudolph was confirmed to be in the cast.

Filming 
Principal photography on the film began on July 7, 2014 in Worcester, Massachusetts. The first day of filming took place at the historic Ralph's Chadwick Square Diner, where Kaitlyn's character sings a ‘70s hit song; the scene took up only three-and-a-half pages of the script. On July 8, 2014, filming was taken place in Norwood, where the crew used the Norwood Theatre office as the set for the film and converted it into the bookstore named "Harper Booksellers." Several shots were taken in and out of the store all day, which featured Dever, Elwes, Rudolph and Shannon, and the store was owned by Elwes's character. On July 10, 2014, filming took place in Wellesley, where they used the Elm Bank Reservation as the set for the film. Filming wrapped-up on July 24, 2014.

Post-production 
In April 2015, the film was in post-production, with an originally scheduled premiere of late 2015. Michael Yezerski was set to provide the score for the film.

Release
The film was released through video on demand, DVD and Blu-Ray on April 4, 2017. With its release delayed until long after filming had been completed in July 2014, the producers were able to dedicate the film to Yelchin, who died in June 2016.

References

External links 
 
 

2017 films
Films shot in Massachusetts
Films set in Massachusetts
Films about families
American drama films
2017 drama films
Films about dysfunctional families
2017 directorial debut films
Films scored by Michael Yezerski
2010s English-language films
2010s American films